The Bréguet 790 Nautilus was a prototype French three-seat coastal patrol flying-boat designed and built by Bréguet Aviation to meet a requirement from the French navy.

Development
The Nautilus had a high-set monoplane wing on a single-step hull, the wing being fabric covered and the hull all-metal. The aircraft was powered by a 720 hp (537 kW) Hispano-Suiza 12Xirs V-12 piston engine strut-mounted above the hull, driving a pusher propeller.

The first of two prototypes flew in 1939 and performed well enough that a production order for 75 was placed. The order was reduced to 45 in May 1940 in order to free production capacity for more urgently needed combat aircraft, but none were built following the German invasion.

Variants
Bréguet 790
Basic three-seat coastal reconnaissance aircraft, powered by  Hispano-Suiza 12Xirs engine.  Two prototypes built.
Bréguet 791
Proposed version powered by single  Gnome-Rhône 14M radial engine. Unbuilt.
Bréguet 792
Proposed version for ship-based reconnaissance aircraft, powered by two  Béarn 6 air-cooled inline engines. Unbuilt.

Specifications

See also

References

Notes

Bibliography

 

1930s French military reconnaissance aircraft
Flying boats
 0790
Single-engined pusher aircraft
High-wing aircraft
Aircraft first flown in 1939